Mousa Nabipour (born August 14, 1983 in Behshahr) is an Iranian professional basketball player, currently playing as a center for Azad University Tehran in the Iranian Basketball Super League. He is 6'11" in height. He was also a member of the Iranian national basketball team that won the FIBA Asia Championship 2007 and he competed at the 2008 Olympic basketball Tournament.

Honours

National team
Asian Championship
Gold medal: 2007
Asian Games
Bronze medal: 2006

Club
Iranian Super League
Champions: 2003, 2005 (Sanam)

External links
 
 

Living people
1983 births
Iranian men's basketball players
Olympic basketball players of Iran
Basketball players at the 2008 Summer Olympics
Asian Games bronze medalists for Iran
Asian Games medalists in basketball
Basketball players at the 2006 Asian Games
Centers (basketball)
Medalists at the 2006 Asian Games
People from Behshahr
2010 FIBA World Championship players
Sportspeople from Mazandaran province